Gavin Millar (11 January 1938 – 20 April 2022) was a Scottish film director, critic and television presenter.

Biography
Millar was born in Clydebank, near Glasgow, the son of Tom Millar and his wife Rita (née Osborne). The family relocated to the Midlands when he was nine and he was educated at King Edward's School, Birmingham.  He undertook national service in the Royal Air Force and then read English at Christ Church, Oxford from 1958 to 1961. Millar took a postgraduate film course at the Slade School of Fine Art in London.

Career
Millar was a film critic for The Listener from 1970 to 1984. He also contributed to Sight and Sound and the London Review of Books. He wrote a new section to Karel Reisz's book The Technique of Film Editing for the 1968 edition. On television, he wrote, produced and presented Arena Cinema for the BBC from 1976 to 1980, and wrote and presented numerous other cinema and visual arts documentaries.

In 1980, he directed Dennis Potter's Cream in My Coffee for London Weekend Television, which received a BAFTA nomination. His first feature film as director was 1985's Dreamchild. His 1994 television film Pat and Margaret, featuring Victoria Wood, received a further BAFTA nomination, and Housewife, 49 (2006), a later collaboration with Wood, won the 2007 award.

Marriage and children
Millar married Sylvia Lane in 1966.  She died in 2012. The couple had five children.

Death
Millar died of a brain tumour on 20 April 2022, aged 84.  He was survived by his five children and by six grandchildren.

Selected works

Feature films
1985 Dreamchild
1989 Danny, the Champion of the World
1995 Funny Bones (actor only)
2000 Complicity
2009

TV
1980 Cream in My Coffee
1982 Intensive Care
1983 Secrets
1983 The Weather in the Streets
1984 Unfair Exchanges
1985 The Russian Soldier; Mr and Mrs Edgehill
1987 Scoop
1988 Tidy Endings
1991 A Murder of Quality
1991 My Friend Walter
1992 Look at It This Way; The Young Indiana Jones Chronicles
1993 The Dwelling Place
1994 Pat and Margaret; A Case of Coincidence
1995 Belle Epoque
1996 The Crow Road
1997 Sex & Chocolate
1998 This Could Be the Last Time; Talking Heads 2
2000 My Fragile Heart
2001 Confessions of an Ugly Stepsister
2002 Ella and the Mothers
2002 The Vice
2002 The Last Detective
2004 King of Fridges
2004-7 Foyle's War
2005 Pickles, the Dog Who Won the World Cup
2006 Housewife, 49

References

External links

1938 births
2022 deaths
People from Clydebank
People educated at King Edward's School, Birmingham
Alumni of Christ Church, Oxford
Alumni of the Slade School of Fine Art
Scottish film critics
Scottish film directors